Kliff may refer to:

Persons
Kliff Hanger, American professional wrestler, better known by his ring name "The Black Diamond" Kliff Hanger
Kliff Kingsbury (born 1979), American football coach and former college and professional quarterback
Sarah Kliff, American journalist and health policy analyst for The New York Times

Music
Kliff (band), Finnish boy band

Fictional characters
Kliff Undersn, founder of the Holy Order in fighting game series Guilty Gear. See List of Guilty Gear characters#Kliff Undersn List of characters

Abbreviations
Kuala Lumpur International Film Festival, known as KLIFF

See also
Cliff (disambiguation)
Rotes Kliff, a 52-metre high line of sea cliffs between Wenningstedt and Kampen on the German North Sea island of Sylt
Morsum-Kliff, an important geological monument in Germany